Molybdenum fluoride can refer to
 Molybdenum(IV) fluoride (molybdenum tetrafluoride), a green ionic solid
 Molybdenum(V) fluoride (molybdenum pentafluoride), a yellow ionic solid
 Molybdenum(VI) fluoride (molybdenum hexafluoride), a white molecular solid or colorless liquid

Molybdenum halides